Sertaneja is a municipality in the state of Paraná in Brazil.

It was established as a municipality according to Law nº 2/1947, dated 10 October  1947 dividing the earlier Cornélio Procópio municipality into 3 new district municipalities: Sertaneja, Leópolis and Congonhas.

The municipal area of Sertaneja is 444,48 km² and its population 5,216 (2020).

References

Municipalities in Paraná